The 1887 Wimbledon Championships took place on the outdoor grass courts at the All England Lawn Tennis Club in Wimbledon, London, United Kingdom. The tournament ran from 2 July until 7 July. It was the 11th staging of the Wimbledon Championships, and the first Grand Slam tennis event of 1887. From 1880 to 1887 the men's singles draw fell from 60 to 16, this was attributed to the superior expertise of the Renshaw brothers and Herbert Lawford. Lawford won the gentleman's singles title after defeating Ernest Renshaw in the All Comers final. Defending champions William Renshaw was unable to play the Challenge Round due to a tennis elbow.

The Ladies singles competition was won by Lottie Dod who won the title at an age of 15 years and 285 days and became the youngest ever Wimbledon singles champion.

Champions

Men's singles

 Herbert Lawford defeated  Ernest Renshaw, 1–6, 6–3, 3–6, 6–4, 6–4

Women's singles

 Lottie Dod defeated  Blanche Bingley, 6–2, 6–0

Men's doubles

 Patrick Bowes-Lyon /  Herbert Wilberforce defeated  Edward Barratt-Smith /  James Herbert Crispe, 6–3, 6–3, 6–2

References

External links
 Official Wimbledon Championships website

 
Wimbledon Championships
Wimbledon Championships
Wimbledon Championships
July 1887 sports events